Clinton Township is one of the twelve townships of Fulton County, Ohio, United States.  The 2010 census found 9,554 people in the township, 2,222 of whom lived in the unincorporated portions of the township.

Geography
Located in the southern part of the county, it borders the following townships:
Dover Township - north
Pike Township - northeast corner
York Township - east
Liberty Township, Henry County - southeast corner
Freedom Township, Henry County - south
Ridgeville Township, Henry County - southwest corner
German Township - west
Franklin Township - northwest corner

The city of Wauseon, the county seat of Fulton County, is located in eastern Clinton Township, and the unincorporated community of Pettisville lies in the township's west.

Name and history

It is one of seven Clinton Townships statewide.

Government
The township is governed by a three-member board of trustees, who are elected in November of odd-numbered years to a four-year term beginning on the following January 1. Two are elected in the year after the presidential election and one is elected in the year before it. There is also an elected township fiscal officer, who serves a four-year term beginning on April 1 of the year after the election, which is held in November of the year before the presidential election. Vacancies in the fiscal officership or on the board of trustees are filled by the remaining trustees.

Attractions

A 2-mile paved section of the Wabash Cannonball Trail is in the city of Wauseon.

Public services

Public Schools

Students from the township are served by the following public local school districts:
 
 Pettisville Local School District
 Wauseon Exempted Village School District

Mail

Mail is delivered in the township by the following U.S. Post Office locations:

 Napoleon, Ohio 43545
 Pettisville, Ohio 43553
 Wauseon, Ohio 43567

Telephone

Most of the township is within the Wauseon telephone exchange, which is served by UTO (United Telephone Company of Ohio,) doing business as CenturyLink, with telephone numbers using the following Numbering Plan Codes:

 419-330
 419-335
 419-337
 419-388
 419-404
 419-583
 419-590

Pettisville and an area south of that are served by the Archbold telephone exchange, which is delivered by UTO (United Telephone Company of Ohio,) doing business as CenturyLink, with telephone numbers using the following Numbering Plan Codes:

 419-220
 419-403
 419-445
 419-446
 419-572
 567-444

A small section of the area where County Road AC and County Road 16 intersect is in the Gerald telephone exchange, delivered by UTO (United Telephone Company of Ohio,) doing business as CenturyLink, with the following codes:

 419-431
 419-598
 567-340

A short section of County Road AC is served by the Ridgeville Corners telephone exchange:

 419-267
 419-374

Electric

Toledo Edison serves the township with electricity.

Highways

Fire and Emergency Medical

Dover Township contracts with the Wauseon Fire Department and Fulton County's Emergency Medical Services (EMS) Department located in Wauseon, Ohio.

References

External links

 *Township Website
County website

Townships in Fulton County, Ohio
Townships in Ohio